Franco J. Vaccarino is a Canadian neuroscientist who served as the eighth president of the University of Guelph.

Vaccarino started his career in 1984 at the University of Toronto Scarborough, where he eventually served as principal. In August 2014, he was elected to succeed Alastair Summerlee as the president of the University of Guelph. He retired from this position at the end of July, 2020.

References

External links
 Office of the President

Canadian neuroscientists
Presidents of the University of Guelph
Living people
Year of birth missing (living people)